As the Angels Reach the Beauty is the second studio album by the symphonic black metal band Graveworm, released on 26 September 1999 through Serenades Records. This is one of Graveworm's more symphonic albums, with strong symphonic metal influences and three symphonic interludes. It was recorded and mixed at Newport Studios, St. Lorenzen, Italy and mastered at Newport Mastering Studios.

The cover artwork is a painting of Luis Royo.

Track listing
All lyrics by Stefano Fiori. All music by Sabine Mair and Stefan Unterpertinger except where noted.
"A Dreaming Beauty" – 7:18
"Portrait of a Deadly Nightshade" – 4:18
"Ceremonial Requiem"  – 3:02
"Nocturnal Hymns" – 7:35
"Behind the Curtain of Darkness" – 4:54
"Pandemonium"  – 2:05 
"Prophecies in Blood" – 5:43
"Into the Dust of Eden" – 5:19
"Graveyard of Angels"  – 2:04

Personnel

Band members
Stefano Fiori – vocals
Stefan Unterpertinger – lead guitar 
Harry Klenk – rhythm guitar
Didi Schraffel – bass
Martin Innerbichler – drums
Sabine Mair – keyboards

Guest musicians
Hermann Kühebacher – Scottish warpipes
Urska Stollowa – violin
Rick van Viechten – violin
Barbara Mary Stone – viola
Iston Vegas – violoncello
Alan Dunn – spoken vocals

Technical staff
Adamo Peppino – engineering, mixing
Reiner Ploner – engineering
Markus Costabiei – mastering

References

External links
As the Angels Reach the Beauty on Discogs.

1999 albums
Graveworm albums